Vytautas Lukša (born 14 August 1984) is a Lithuanian professional football player currently playing for Dainava Alytus.

External links

1984 births
Living people
Sportspeople from Alytus
Lithuanian footballers
Association football midfielders
Lithuania international footballers
Lithuanian expatriate footballers
Expatriate footballers in Belarus
Lithuanian expatriate sportspeople in Belarus
Belarusian Premier League players
Expatriate footballers in Ukraine
Lithuanian expatriate sportspeople in Ukraine
Ukrainian Premier League players
Expatriate footballers in Poland
Lithuanian expatriate sportspeople in Poland
Ekstraklasa players
A Lyga players
FK Dainava Alytus players
FC Vilnius players
FBK Kaunas footballers
FC Partizan Minsk players
FC Mariupol players
FC Arsenal Kyiv players
FK Tauras Tauragė players
FK Ekranas players
Polonia Warsaw players
FC Gomel players
FK Riteriai players
FK Žalgiris players
FK Jonava players